London Towers were a professional basketball team based in London, England. They enjoyed considerable success in the 1990s and early 2000s, collecting 3 titles in the British Basketball League (BBL) as well as regularly competing in European competitions such as the Euroleague and EuroCup. They contested a fierce rivalry with fellow London team Greater London Leopards for much of this spell. After several years of decline with financial difficulties and venue issues, owner Costi Zombanakis pulled the first team from the BBL in the summer of 2006, and although the club's second team continued in the regional English Basketball League, the London Towers brand folded in 2009.

Franchise history

High risers

Established as Tower Hamlets, in the borough of the same name, the London-based team entered NBL Division 2 in 1984. By 1989 they finished eleventh, out of the eleven teams in the league and were due to be relegated. However, the Carlsberg League Division 1 was suffering a membership crisis at the time and was about to be reduced to just seven teams. With the newly built Docklands Arena available as a possible venue not too far from the team's base, the Tower Hamlets franchise was admitted to country's top professional league as London's representatives, rebranded as London Docklands for the 1989-90 season.

On the move again

The following season the Docklands team left the giant arena as they, in common with other basketball teams at the time, struggled with the cost of a big arena rent. They returned "home" to Tower Hamlets and the Newham Leisure Centre, although their first two seasons yielded just three League victories.

Towers rise
It was 1991 when the franchise which came to sit astride British basketball finally gained its most well-known label. Renamed London Towers, but still playing at Newham the club's fortunes turned around in the 1991-92 season, as they finished fourth, and a move to the Sobell Sports Centre in Islington saw them finish third in 1993.

The Wembley Days

In 1994 the Towers made the short move across North London to the prestigious Wembley Arena complex, splitting home games between the Arena itself and the adjacent Exhibition halls. It was here that they enjoyed their best seasons, winning multiple titles including the Budweiser League Championship, League Playoffs and 7-up trophy.

The 1996-97 season also saw the Towers make their European debut appearance, competing in the newly named EuroCup. After qualifying from the group stage with a 4–6 record, they exited the competition in the first knockout round losing to Avtodor Saratov of Russia by five points over two legs. The following season also saw them take part in the Eurocup, however this time they finished bottom of their group with a 1–9 record.

Heading South

With their Wembley venue proving expensive and presenting problems for European competitions, in the summer of 1998 Towers "merged" with fellow BBL team Crystal Palace. The 1998–1999 season saw games split between Wembley and Crystal Palace National Sports Centre, with the team moving full time to Crystal Palace for the following season.

Towers continued to be one of the British Basketball League's top teams, winning Southern Conference titles and the Uniball Trophy. They also regularly competed in European competitions such as the Saporta Cup, NEBL (Northern European Basketball League), and even the prestigious Euroleague for two seasons, coached by NBA Championship winning coach Nick Nurse in one of these years.

The End

Despite working on plans to build their own arena for a number of years, linking with their community and development work, in 2006 the London Towers first team pulled out of BBL, for a "one year break". In common with at least two other teams who followed this path at around the same time, they were never to return. The recently started second team, London Towers II, continued to fly the flag for a few seasons, competing in the English Basketball League Division 3 and operating the club's youth and development teams, before also folding.

Head coaches
 Mark Dunning
 Kevin Cadle
 Lino Frattin
 Ron Abegglen
 Nick Nurse
 David Lindstrom
 Robbie Peers

Assistant Coaches - Tony Garbelotto, Andre Alleyne, Graham Wilson, Alex Fuhrmann, Julian Martinez, Joe Lofthouse.

Season-by-season records

Home arenas

London Arena (1989–1991)
Newham Leisure Centre (1991–1992)
Sobell Sports Centre (1992–1994)
Wembley Arena (1994–1999) - split games between Crystal Palace from 1998.
Crystal Palace Sports Centre (1998–2007) - split games between Wembley Arena until 1999.
Harris Sports Centre  (2007–2009)

Trophies

1995/96 League Champions, National Cup Winners, League Trophy Winners
1996/97 Championship Winners, League Trophy Winners
1998/99 Tournament of Champions Winners, Championship Winners
1999/00 Southern Conference Champions, League Trophy Winners
2000/01 Tournament of Champions Winners, Southern Conference Champions

References

External links
Official London Towers website

Basketball teams established in 1984
Basketball teams disestablished in 2009
Defunct basketball teams in the United Kingdom
Basketball teams in London
Sport in the London Borough of Tower Hamlets
1984 establishments in England
2009 disestablishments in England
Former British Basketball League teams